The Larson D-1 was an agricultural biplane that was purpose-built to replace Boeing Stearman cropdusters.

Development
In 1955, Merle Larson designed the D-1 with updated features to improve cropdusting compared to the popular Boeing Stearman in use at the time. The aircraft used only 25 percent of the number of parts as a Stearman.

Design
The biplane featured a steel tube fuselage, and aluminum covered wings. The fuselage was fabric covered only to behind the cockpit, leaving the rest of the tail structure exposed, preventing dust buildup in the tail. The aircraft had twin rudders mounted outboard of the spray trail. Each of these were all-moving with anti-servo tabs. Standard automotive wheels and tires were employed to reduce cost as low-cost World War II surplus was becoming too old, and new aviation tires cost nearly five times as much.

Specifications (Larson D-1)

Notes

References

1950s United States agricultural aircraft
Biplanes
Single-engined tractor aircraft
Aircraft first flown in 1955
Twin-tail aircraft
Conventional landing gear